Marie Pachler (2 October 1794 – 10 April 1855) was an Austrian pianist. She was an admirer of Ludwig van Beethoven, and a friend of Franz Schubert.

Biography
Marie Pachler was born as Marie Leopold Koschak on 2 October 1794 in Graz, Austria. He father, Aldebrand Koschak was a Slovenian lawyer. Her mother, Therese, came from a business family in Vienna. Her parents encouraged her musical talents, and supported her musical and general education. She took music lessons from Heimrich Gugel and Julius Franz Borgias Schneller. During her childhood she performed at concerts organized by her father, and she also presented her first compositions at the age of nine. In the beginning of her musical career, she faced with financial problems.

On 12 May 1816 she married Karl Pachler, who was also a barrister in Graz. In 1817 she met Ludwig van Beethoven, German composer and pianist, who appreciated her musical talent.

She also performed along with Franz Schubert, an Austrian composer, in charity concert, which was organized by the Graz Music Association.

She died in Graz on 10 April 1855.

References

1794 births
1855 deaths
Austrian women pianists
19th-century Austrian musicians